Swazi may refer to:
 Swazi people, a people of southeastern Africa
 Swazi language
 Eswatini (former name Swaziland), or a citizen thereof

Language and nationality disambiguation pages